Edward Royd Rice (25 April 1790 – 27 November 1878) was an English politician and first-class cricketer. He was Member of Parliament (MP) for Dover from 1847 to 1857.

In cricket, he was associated with Middlesex and was active from 1826 to 1834, being recorded in two first-class matches in which he totalled 22 runs with a highest score of 13.

Two of his sons, Admiral Sir Edward Bridges Rice and Admiral Sir Ernest Rice, achieved flag rank in the Royal Navy.

References

1790 births
1878 deaths
English cricketers
English cricketers of 1826 to 1863
Middlesex cricketers
Members of the Parliament of the United Kingdom for Dover
UK MPs 1847–1852
UK MPs 1852–1857
Sportspeople from Dover, Kent